Jānis Strēlnieks (born 1 September 1989) is a Latvian professional basketball player for AEK Athens of the Greek Basket League and the Basketball Champions League. He also represents the senior Latvia national team.

Professional career
Strēlnieks started his professional career in 2007, with Latvian team Ventspils, where he played for four years. In 2010, he was pursued by the EuroLeague club Union Olimpija, which was then head coached by Jure Zdovc. However, Ventspils didn't let him go to Slovenia. After all, in November 2011, he finally got a chance to play for coach Zdovc, as he was at the time coaching the Russian team Spartak Saint Petersburg, that had bought out Strēlnieks' contract from Ventspils. He spent the next two seasons with Spartak. One of the highlights of his time in Spartak, was making the EuroCup's 2012 Final Four.

In August 2013, Strēlnieks joined the EuroLeague team Budivelnyk, signing a two-year contract with them. Strēlnieks enjoyed a successful season with Budivelnyk, that included winning the Ukrainian Super League championship, and playing in the EuroLeague for the first time. However, after the season ended, he had to opt out of his contract, due to the unstable political situation in Ukraine at the time.

In July 2014, he signed a one-year deal with the German club Brose Bamberg. In the following three seasons, Strēlnieks won the German Basketball Bundesliga championship with Bamberg. In the 2015–16 and 2016–17 seasons, Strēlnieks also played in the EuroLeague with Brose.

On 20 June 2017, Strēlnieks signed a two-year contract with Olympiacos, of the Greek Basket League and the EuroLeague.

On 8 July 2019, Strēlnieks signed a two-year deal with CSKA Moscow. On 11 June 2021, Strēlnieks officially parted ways with the Russian club. In 70 games (16 starts), he averaged 6.2 points, 1.2 rebounds and 2.0 assists. 

On 29 July 2021, Strēlnieks signed a one-year deal with Žalgiris Kaunas of the Lithuanian Basketball League and the EuroLeague.

On August 10, 2022, Strēlnieks joined AEK Athens of the Greek Basket League on a one-year deal.

National team career

Latvia junior national team
In 2007, Strēlnieks was a part of the Latvian Under-18 junior national team that won the bronze medal at the 2007 FIBA Europe Under-18 Championship, which was held in Madrid, Spain. He made a game-winning basket in the last seconds of regulation against Lithuania's Under-18 junior national team, in the bronze medal game.

Latvia senior national team
Strēlnieks is a member of the senior Latvia national team. With Latvia, Strēlnieks played at the following tournaments: the EuroBasket 2011, EuroBasket 2013, EuroBasket 2015, the Belgrade 2016 FIBA World Olympic Qualifying Tournament, and EuroBasket 2017.

Career statistics

EuroLeague

|-
| align="left" | 2013–14
| align="left" | Budivelnyk
| 10 || 6 || 22.5 || .509 || .464 || 1.000 || 1.4 || 2.6 || .9 || .0 || 8.1 || 8.4
|-
| align="left" | 2015–16
| align="left" rowspan=2 | Bamberg
| 24 || 4 || 24.2 || .476 || .404 || .913 || 2.0 || 3.3 || .7 || .1 || 9.8 || 10.7
|-
| align="left" | 2016–17
| 22 || 5 || 25.1 || .522 || .459 || .892 || 2.2 || 3.5 || .6 || .1 || 11.7 || 12.8
|-
| align="left" | 2017–18
| align="left" rowspan=2 | Olympiacos
| 34 || 4 || 19.9 || .435 || .382 || .918 || 1.3 || 2.1 || .6 || .0 || 7.5 || 7.1
|-
| align="left" | 2018–19
| 20 || 5 || 20.4 || .495 || .459 || .868 || 1.9 || 2.0 || .7 || .1 || 8.8 || 8.3
|-
| align="left" | 2019–20
| style="text-align:left;" rowspan=2| CSKA Moscow
| 21 || 6 || 16.0 || .538 || .417 || .921 || 1.8 || 2.0 || .6 || .0 || 7.2 || 8.5
|-
| style="text-align:left;"| 2020–21
| 26 || 3 || 13.4 || .460 || .417 || .643|| 0.8 || 1.6 || .3 || .0 || 4.4 || 3.2
|-
| align="left" | 2021–22
| align="left" | Žalgiris
| 23 || 22 || 20.5 || .391 || .337 || .857 || 1.7 || 1.8 || .7 || .1 || 6.5 || 5.6
|- class="sortbottom"
| align="center" colspan="2"| Career
| 180 || 55 || 20.0 || .466 || .410 || .891 || 1.6 || 2.3 || .6 || .0 || 7.9 || 7.9

Personal life
His older brother, Artūrs, is also a professional basketball player.

References

External links
Jānis Strēlnieks at baskethotel.com
Jānis Strēlnieks at draftexpress.com

Jānis Strēlnieks at eurobasket.com
Jānis Strēlnieks at euroleague.net (archive)
Janis Strelnieks at euroleaguebasketball.net
Jānis Strēlnieks at fiba.com (archive)
Jānis Strēlnieks at fibaeurope.com
Janis Strelnieks at realgm.com

1989 births
Living people
AEK B.C. players
BC Budivelnyk players
BC Spartak Saint Petersburg players
BC Žalgiris players
BK Ventspils players
Brose Bamberg players
Latvian expatriate basketball people in Russia
Latvian expatriate basketball people in Germany
Latvian expatriate basketball people in Greece
Latvian expatriate basketball people in Lithuania
Latvian men's basketball players
Olympiacos B.C. players
PBC CSKA Moscow players
People from Talsi
Point guards
Shooting guards